Elizabeth Jane "Bettie" Hewes (March 12, 1924 – November 6, 2001) was a politician from Alberta, Canada.

Hewes graduated from the University of Toronto in 1944 with a degree in occupational therapy.  From 1964 to 1967, she was the executive director of the Canadian Mental Health Association, and from 1967 to 1974, she was Director of the Edmonton Social Planning Council. She also served as chairman of the board of Canadian National Railway from 1984 to 1985; she was the first woman to hold that position.

She served on Edmonton city council from 1974 to 1984.  During that period, she was a leading member of an enlightened urban reform group called Urban Reform Group Edmonton (URGE), which eventually elected several members to Council. She served as acting mayor after the death of William Hawrelak in 1975.

She was elected to the Legislative Assembly of Alberta in the 1986 provincial election as the member for Edmonton-Gold Bar under the banner of the Liberal Party.  She was re-elected in 1989 and 1993.  In 1993, she received over 10,000 votes, the largest number won by any candidate in that election. In 1994, she served as the interim leader of the Liberal Party.  She did not run in the 1997 election. She died of a heart attack in 2001.

References

 

1924 births
2001 deaths
Alberta Liberal Party MLAs
Female Canadian political party leaders
Edmonton city councillors
Leaders of the Alberta Liberal Party
Women MLAs in Alberta
Women municipal councillors in Canada
20th-century Canadian women politicians